The LVII Legislature of the Congress of Sonora met from September 2003 to September 2006. All members of the Congress were elected in the 2003 Sonora state elections.

The LVII Legislature consisted of 17 deputies from the Institutional Revolutionary Party (PRI), 12 deputies from the National Action Party (PAN) and 2 deputies from the Party of the Democratic Revolution (PRD).

Composition

Congress of Sonora